Ernst Fäs was a Swiss cyclist. He competed in the team pursuit and the time trial events at the 1928 Summer Olympics.

References

External links
 

1909 births
1980 deaths
Swiss male cyclists
Olympic cyclists of Switzerland
Cyclists at the 1928 Summer Olympics
Place of birth missing